Live Wood, released in 1994 was Paul Weller's first solo live album, comprising a collection of high energy and melodic numbers selected from his 1993/1994 tour. Songs were chosen from a number of the concerts, including the Royal Albert Hall, London (22 November 1993 - incorrectly listed as December), Wolverhampton Civic Hall (9 March 1994), the Paradiso in Amsterdam (16 April 1994) and La Luna, Brussels (17 April 1994).

The album mixes songs from Weller's eponymous debut album and its follow up, Wild Wood, along with snatches of covers (The Who's "Magic Bus", Donald Byrd's "Dominoes" and Edwin Starr's "War").  The only song featured on neither album is "This Is No Time", which originally appeared as the B-side of single "The Weaver".  Upon its release, Live Wood reached #13 in the UK album chart.

Track listing

Personnel
Paul Weller – vocals, guitar, piano
Steve "Supe" White - drums
Yolanda Charles – bass
Helen Turner – keyboards
Steve Cradock – guitar
Clive Sparkman – keyboards
Dodge Aspinell – drums
David Liddle – guitar

1994 live albums
Paul Weller live albums
Go! Discs live albums
Live albums recorded at the Royal Albert Hall